Trial by jury in Scotland is used in the courts of Scotland in solemn procedure for trial on indictment before a judge and jury for serious criminal cases, and in certain civil cases (mainly personal injury claims)

Criminal procedure in Scotland is generally regulated by the Criminal Procedure (Scotland) Act 1995 (as amended) and various Acts of Adjournal passed by the High Court of Justiciary.  Juries in these cases consist of 15 people; if jurors drop out e.g. because of illness the trial can continue with a minimum of 12 jurors.  In criminal trials conviction is on the basis of a majority verdict, with eight jurors required to decide that the accused is guilty; should fewer than eight jurors declare a guilty verdict then the accused is acquitted, so a hung jury is an impossibility in Scottish criminal law. In the past some people were executed on majority verdicts in Scotland, such as Susan Newell, who had one juror dissenting.  The jury has a choice of three verdicts: guilty (a conviction), not guilty (acquittal) and not proven (also acquittal).

In civil trials there is a jury of 12 people, and a hung jury is possible.

The pool of potential jurors is chosen purely at random, and Scottish courts have set themselves against any form of jury vetting.

History 
During World War II the Administration of Justice (Emergency Provisions) (Scotland) Act 1939 provided that both civil and criminal juries would have seven members, of whom two would be special members, except for trials for treason or murder, or where a case in the High Court of Justiciary required the regular jury of fifteen on the "gravity of matters in issue".

Eligibility 
The rules of eligibility for jury service are broadly similar to England, but people with legal experience (such as solicitors, advocates, or court clerks) are excluded, as are those who have been involved in the justice system, including, but not limited to, police officers (both serving and retired), medical forensic practitioners and coroners, and prison officers. 

Those who meet all of the following criteria are eligible for jury service:
 British, Irish, Commonwealth and European Union citizens on the Electoral Register;
 aged 18 or over;
 ordinarily resident in the UK, Channel Islands or the Isle of Man for any period of at least 5 years since the age of 13; and
 not disqualified for whatever reason.

Selection of jurors (criminal cases) 
In criminal cases, there need to be at least 30 potential jurors present in the court for the balloting of a jury to begin. The names of the potential jurors are written on paper slips and drawn out of a glass bowl in open court by the clerk. The jurors then take the oath collectively and swear by "almighty God" without using any religious text. Those who prefer to affirm then do so collectively.

References

External links 
Information for jurors in Scotland
Text of the Criminal Procedure (Scotland) Act 1995
The Modern Scottish Jury in Criminal Trials
A Lay Person's Guide to Scottish Solemn Criminal Procedure

Scottish criminal law
Scotland